Ivanji Grad is a village west of Komen in the Littoral region of Slovenia.

The small church in the settlement is dedicated to The Finding of the True Cross and belongs to the Parish of Komen.

References

External links

Ivanji Grad on Geopedia

Populated places in the Municipality of Komen